Enteromius chlorotaenia is a species of ray-finned fish in the genus Enteromius from Togo, Benin, Nigeria, Cameroon and Chad.

References 

 

Enteromius
Fish described in 1911
Taxa named by George Albert Boulenger